Kolohe Kai is a Hawaiian reggae pop musical group, formed in 2009 by lead singer and songwriter Roman De Peralta. 

Kolohe Kai consists of De Peralta, Jasmine Moikeha (vocals), Kolomona Ku (keyboard and saxophone), Luke Daddario (drummer), Imua Garza (guitar), and Kahale Morales (bass guitar).

History
The group's 2009 debut album was This is the Life, and their 2011 follow-up album was Love Town. Successful singles included "Cool Down" and "Ehu Girl". Their 2014 album Paradise reached third place on Billboard magazine's Reggae Album chart.

In 2019, Kolohe Kai released their fourth album, Summer To Winter, which reached number one on Billboard's Reggae Album chart.

Singles

Higher - 15 November 2016
Natural High (Dub) - 1 June 2019
Will You Be Mine (R&B Version) - 1 August 2019
Catching Lightning - 24 July 2020
Speechless - 28 February 2020
When the Rain Falls - 15 October 2020
Isn't She Lovely - 8 October 2021
I Think You're Beautiful - 25 February 2022

Albums

ALBUMS:

This Is the Life - 15 June 2009
Love Town - 8 March 2011
Paradise - 2014
Summer to Winter - 2019
Hazel Eyes - 3 June 2022

EP:

This Is the Life (Acoustic Remix EP) - 12 November 2013
Love Town (Acoustic Remix EP) - 12 November 2013

LIVE:

Live Album 10th Anniversary - 5 November 2021

COMPILATION:

Best of Kolohe Kai (Acoustic) - 9 July 2021

OTHER:

Sugarshack Selects, Vol. 2 - Round and Around (On the Spot in HI) - 14 August 2020

References

American reggae musical groups
American pop music groups
Musical groups from Hawaii